Triarylmethane dyes are synthetic organic compounds containing  triphenylmethane backbones. As dyes, these compounds are intensely colored.  They are produced industrially as dyes.

Families
Triarylmethane dyes can be grouped into families according to the nature of the substituents on the aryl groups.  In some cases, the anions associated with the cationic dyes (say crystal violet) vary even though the name of the dye does not.  Often it is shown as chloride.

Methyl violet dyes
Methyl violet dyes have dimethylamino groups at the p-positions of two aryl groups.

Fuchsine dyes
Fuchsine dyes have primary or secondary amines (NH2 or NHMe) functional groups at the p-positions of each aryl group.

Phenol dyes
Phenol dyes have hydroxyl groups at the p positions of at least two aryl groups.

Malachite green dyes
Malachite green dyes are related to the methyl violet dyes, except that they contain one phenyl (C6H5) group.

Victoria blue dyes
Victoria blue dyes are related to the methyl violet dyes, except they contain one naphthylamino group.  Variation is found is dimethylamine vs diethylamino substituents on the phenyl rings and variations of the secondary amine on the naphthyl group.

Xanthene dyes

Xanthene dyes feature a xanthene core.  They are not widely used as textiles, but for other applications.

Bridged arenes

Where two of the aryl groups are bridged by a heteroatom, these triarylmethane compounds may be further categorized into acridines (nitrogen-bridged), xanthenes (oxygen-bridged), and thioxanthenes (sulfur-bridged).

Synthesis

The amine-containing dyes are often prepared from Michler's ketone or its diethylamino analogue.  In this way, the third aryl group is readily differentiated.  The Friedel–Crafts alkylation reaction is a popular method to prepare many of the phenolic derivatives:

Applications
In addition to their dominant use as dyes, many of these dyes react reversibly with acid and base, and thus serve as pH indicators.

See also
Zelyonka attack
Phthalein dye

References